Xhonneux is a Belgian surname. Notable people with the surname include:

Frédéric Xhonneux (born 1983), Belgian track and field athlete
Henri Xhonneux (1945–1995), Belgian film director and screenwriter

Surnames of Belgian origin